Sadek Wahba (born 1965) is an American economist and investor who focuses on infrastructure investments.  He is a frequent commentator on the need for more investment in infrastructure to promote sustainable economic growth. He is the founder and managing partner of the Miami-based global infrastructure investment company I Squared Capital. In 2022 he was appointed by President Biden to the President's National Infrastructure Advisory Council.

Early life and education
Wahba is the great-grandson of Youssef Wahba Pasha (1852-1934), Egyptian Prime Minister and jurist.  His grandfather, Mourad Wahba, was a high court judge.

Wahba was born in Cairo and attended the Collège de la Sainte Famille. He has a Ph.D. in economics from Harvard University, a M.Sc. in economics from the London School of Economics and a B.A. in economics from the American University in Cairo.

Career
Wahba began his career as an economist for the World Bank, where he worked on the social dimensions of structural adjustment.  He subsequently joined Lehman Brothers, where he worked on structured financing. In 1998, he joined Morgan Stanley, where he started Morgan Stanley Infrastructure Partners and was Chief Executive Officer of Morgan Stanley Infrastructure.

In 2012, Wahba formed I Squared Capital, a U.S.-based private equity group that invests in infrastructure projects in the U.S. and in developing economies, particularly China and India. The group manages over $25 billion in assets, including a commitment from the U.S. government's Overseas Private Investment Corporation to invest in Southeast Asia.  The firm’s assets are focused in the energy, utilities, transport, digital infrastructure and social sectors in the U.S., Europe and in select high-growth economies including China, India and Latin America.  I Squared Capital's portfolio companies employ over 12,000 professionals.

Infrastructure advocacy
Wahba is known as an advocate for increased investment in infrastructure both to address public needs and as a tool to create sustainable economic growth. He argues that infrastructure investment is capable of stimulating economic growth while also providing tangible benefits to the public and the environment.

He cites the 2021 Texas power crisis as an example of the "crisis" caused by long-term under-investment in domestic infrastructure and neglect. In addition to tax-funded investment, Wahba proposes additional infrastructure investment sources including pension funds, the creation of an infrastructure IRA, overseas capital and the establishment of a public-private infrastructure bank.

Wahba writes frequently about infrastructure issues. His  articles advocating greater investment in infrastructure and increased use of private investment include "Can the Private Sector Bring About the 'Greening' of Infrastructure" (Forbes), "US Infra Funding Needs More Than Just a Tax Hike", "The U.S. Needs an Infrastructure Bank That Models the World Bank" (The Hill), "Biden's Billion-Dollar Infrastructure Plan Needs a Dedicated IRA to Pay for It" (Miami Herald), "Pension Funds Can Launch a New Infrastructure Era" (Pensions & Investments), "A Three-Step Action Plan to Save US Infrastructure" (Infrastructure Investor) and "Upgrading our Crumbling Infrastructure Could Recession-Proof Our Nation" (Miami Herald).

Wahba is a published author on economic research, including articles in the Journal of the American Statistical Association, Review of Economics and Statistics as well as other publications and proceedings. One of his publications was selected by the Massachusetts Institute of Technology as one of its 50 most influential papers in the last 50 years. His research at Harvard included labor migration and worker remittances as a source of foreign capital to emerging markets.  He has also researched the measurement of causal inference in social studies.

He has appeared frequently on Bloomberg, CNBC, Nasdaq, Yahoo! Finance, TD Ameritrade and Cheddar.

He is a member of the President's Infrastructure Advisory Council.

Awards and honors
Wahba is a senior fellow at the Development Research Institute of New York University, a member of the board of trustees of the American University in Cairo, a foundation fellow of St Antony's College at the University of Oxford, a former member of the Brookings Foreign Policy Leadership Council, and was part of the expert committee on the World Economic Forum first report on global infrastructure investments. He is a member of the Council on Foreign Relations and the Global Advisory Council of the Wilson Advisory Center, and a member of the board of directors of the Miami Cancer Institute.

In 2019, Wahba became the only person to receive the "Global Personality of the Year" award from Infrastructure Investor magazine twice and Global Infrastructure Personality of the Decade by Private Equity International (PEI).

In 2023, the Wilson Center announced the Wahba Institute for Strategic Competition, an initiative intended to support policy reforms that strengthen American leadership.

References

1965 births
Egyptian emigrants to the United States
Living people
Harvard Graduate School of Arts and Sciences alumni
Alumni of the London School of Economics
The American University in Cairo alumni